Fetterbush is a common name for several plants in the family Ericaceae, and may refer to:
Leucothoe – several species including:
Leucothoe fontanesiana (fetterbush)
Pieris – several species including:
Pieris floribunda (mountain fetterbush)
Lyonia lucida (fetterbush lyonia)

Ericaceae